Karim El-Ahmadi Aroussi (Arabic: كريم الأحمدي; born 27 January 1985) is a professional footballer who plays as a defensive midfielder. El-Ahmadi was born in the Netherlands and played for FC Twente and Feyenoord before moving to the Premier League with Aston Villa in 2012 and subsequently returning to Feyenoord in September 2014 and before moving to the Al-Ittihad in the Saudi Professional League in 2018. Born in the Netherlands, he represents Morocco internationally.

Early life
El Ahmadi was born and raised in Enschede, Overijssel, Netherlands. His parents are both Moroccan, making him eligible to acquire the Moroccan citizenship and represent the Morocco national football team.

Club career

UDI
At the age of 9, El Ahmadi started playing football at local Enschede club UDI. He got noticed quickly by scouts from Twente and was invited to join their academy.

FC Twente
On 21 March 2004, El Ahmadi made his official debut in Twente's first team in the away match against FC Utrecht (2–0), where he played 90 minutes. El Ahmadi able to play 2 more games against Groningen and RBC Roosendaal but with the return of On the last match of the season in a match against RKC Waalwijk on 9 May 2004, El Ahmadi provided as assist for Kim Christensen to make it 3–2 but RKC Waalwijk scored in the late minutes to make 3–3.

The following season 2004–05, El Ahmadi began coming on as a substitute for the next two games against Ajax and RKC Waalwijk at the start of the season. In a match against Heerenveen on 28 August 2004, El Ahmadi played for 90 minutes and setting up a goal for Blaise Nkufo in a 4–1 victory. On 13 November 2004, El Ahmadi scored his first goal for the club in a 2–0 win over N.E.C. At the end of the season, El Ahmadi played 16 league games, playing mostly on the wing positions. He then quickly became a first team regular.

The following 2005–06 season, El Ahmadi found himself out of the first team and made 8 appearances following the arrival of Kennedy Bakırcıoğlu and Patrick Gerritsen. In the following 2006–07 season, El Ahmadi suffered a knee injury in a UEFA Cup match against Estonian side Levadia Tallinn in a 1–1 draw. After recovering, El Ahmadi returned to the reserve and by mid-November, El Ahmadi played his first match of the season, coming on as a substitute for Wout Brama in a 7–1 win over Groningen. After the match, El Ahmadi began establishing himself in the starting eleven, playing in the right side of the support. In late-October, El Ahmadi signed a contract with the club, until 2009, with an options to extend until 2011. On 3 February 2007, El Ahmadi scored the first goal in a match with Twente won 2–1 over Excelsior. On 8 April 2007, El Ahmadi scored Twente's only goal in the game in a 1–1 draw against Heracles. El Ahmadi played a single game for the club from 13 November 2006 to 29 April 2007. At the end of season 2006–07, the club finished fourth which resulted in entering the UEFA Cup.

The following 2007–08 season, Twente began suffering after the club sold Bakırcıoğlu to Ajax and Sharbel Touma sold to German side Borussia Mönchengladbach. Even worse, Patrick Gerritsen suffered a leg injury, leading El Ahmadi to get more playing time in the starting line-up. In late July, El Ahmadi signed a contract extension which will keep him until 2011. Manager Fred Rutten said on a new contract: "For the club it's fantastic that we can keep players of this kind,". At the end of 2007–08 season, El Ahmadi made 33 appearances, primarily playing as a defender. At the end of the season FC Twente qualified for the UEFA Champions League, all thanks to the rapid development from the defensive midfielder.

Feyenoord
On 16 April 2008, it was announced that El Ahmadi signed a five-year deal with Dutch club Feyenoord for a transfer fee of €5 million (£4.3 million).

After a groin injury had initially kept him from playing he made his debut on 2 October 2008, coming on as a substitute for Luigi Bruins in the UEFA Cup-match against Kalmar FF, which Feyenoord won 2–1. He made his debut in the starting line-up against NEC  before coming off after 58 minutes, and the game ended in a 0–2 home defeat on 5 October 2008. On 9 November 2008, El Ahmadi scored his first goal for the club in a 5–2 win over Utrecht. On 22 February 2009, El Ahmadi scored his second goal for the club in a 2–0 win over De Graafschap. Since making his debut, he played regularly in the starting line-up which led to interest from a German team Hamburger SV. In early April El Ahmadi, suffered an ankle injury before making his return in the last game of the season, a 3–2 loss against Roda JC. At the end of the season, he was linked to league rivals PSV Eindhoven, however, no offer was made from the club.

In the following 2009–10 season under manager Mario Been, El Ahmadi was deployed in central midfield with the rise of youngsters Leroy Fer and Jonathan de Guzmán. Playing in this position, he played 26 league games. In the quarter final of the KNVB Cup, he scored a brace and set up a goal for captain Giovanni van Bronckhorst in a 3–0 win over PSV Eindhoven on 27 January 2010. Feyenoord would later on reach the final of the KNVB Cup, which they lost 6–1 on aggregate to Ajax. At the end of 2009–10 season, El Ahmadi was linked to another German team, Schalke 04.

After a loan spell at Al Ahli Club, El Ahmadi returned to feyenoord. Under manager Ronald Koeman he managed to become a regular in the starting line-up as a midfielder forming a partnership with Jordy Clasie and Otman Bakkal. On 11 September 2011, he scored his first goal since 2009 in a 3–1 win over NAC Breda. On 16 October 2011, El Ahmadi scored again this season in a 4–0 win over VVV-Venlo.

Loan to Al Ahli Club

After making 15 league appearances in the 2010–11 season at Feyenoord, El Ahmadi joined an UAE team Al Ahli Club on a six-month loan deal in order for the club to boost funds required to sign a new striker on 25 January 2011. On 4 February 2011, he made his debut for the club in a 0–0 draw against Al Dhafra S.C.C. On 24 March 2011, he scored his first goal in the UAE League with a 2–2 draw against Ittihad Kalba. During his loan El Ahmadi appeared in 10 games and scored one goal. At the end of the season, he stated he wanted to play European Football again next season and that the level of competition at Al Ahli was 'too low' compared to the 'weakest teams in the Dutch league'. The chairman of Al Ahli football club, Abdullah Saeed Al Naboudah, said the club wanted to sign El Ahmadi on a permanent basis, however, the two clubs failed to reach an agreement.

Aston Villa
On 26 June 2012, both the British and Dutch media strongly linked El Ahmadi with a transfer to Aston Villa of England's Premier League. Soon after, new Villa manager Paul Lambert confirmed his interest in the player. On 2 July 2012, El Ahmadi completed his transfer from Feyenoord to Aston Villa for an undisclosed fee believed to be around £2,000,000. This made him Lambert's first signing as Aston Villa manager, and Aston Villa's second signing of the summer (following Australia international Brett Holman's move from AZ). On 14 July 2012, El Ahmadi made his debut in a 2–1 win against Burton Albion at the Pirelli Stadium, demonstrating a man of the match performance. On 25 August, he made his home debut and scored a spectacular strike in the 74th minute, in Aston Villa's 3–1 defeat to Everton. Having made a good start despite losing opening two Premier League games of the season, El Ahmadi was voted the club's player of the month of August. Later in the season, El Ahmadi was left out of the squad due to injury and made 24 appearances across all competitions. El Ahmadi started the 2013–14 season in very good form, demonstrating solid performances in midfield, including a goal in a 3–2 win against Manchester City.In Aston Villa's win against Chelsea, El Ahmadi escaped serious injury after Chelsea midfielder Ramires appeared to stamp on El Ahmadi. As a result, Ramires was sent off. Chelsea manager José Mourinho was also sent to the stands in the aftermath of the incident.

Return to Feyenoord
On 1 September 2014, El Ahmadi returned to Feyenoord for an undisclosed transfer fee, signing a contract that would keep him at De Kuip until 2017.

On 22 April 2018 he played as Feyenoord won the 2017–18 KNVB Cup final 3–0 against AZ Alkmaar.

Al-Ittihad
On 9 July 2018, El Ahmadi signed a two-year contract with Saudi Arabian side Al-Ittihad.

International career
El Ahmadi played for the Dutch national youth teams, but opted to represent Morocco at the 2005 FIFA World Youth Championship in the Netherlands.

In May 2018 he was named in Morocco's 23-man squad for the 2018 World Cup in Russia.

Personal life
El Ahmadi is a practicing Muslim.

Career statistics

Club

International

Honours
Twente
 KNVB Cup runner-up: 2003–04

Feyenoord
 Eredivisie: 2016–17
 KNVB Cup: 2015–16, 2017–18; runner-up: 2009–10
 Johan Cruijff Shield: 2017

Al Ittihad
 King's Cup runner-up: 2019
 Saudi Super Cup runner-up: 2019
Individual
Dutch Footballer of the Year: 2016–17

References

External links

 
 Voetbal International – Karim El Ahmadi 
 
 

1985 births
Living people
Citizens of Morocco through descent
Moroccan footballers
Morocco international footballers
Dutch footballers
Moroccan Muslims
Riffian people
Dutch Muslims
FC Twente players
Feyenoord players
Al Ahli Club (Dubai) players
Aston Villa F.C. players
Ittihad FC players
Eredivisie players
Premier League players
Saudi Professional League players
Dutch sportspeople of Moroccan descent
Association football midfielders
Footballers from Enschede
UAE Pro League players
2012 Africa Cup of Nations players
2013 Africa Cup of Nations players
2017 Africa Cup of Nations players
Moroccan expatriate footballers
Expatriate footballers in the United Arab Emirates
Expatriate footballers in England
Expatriate footballers in Saudi Arabia
2018 FIFA World Cup players
2019 Africa Cup of Nations players
Dutch expatriate footballers
Dutch expatriate sportspeople in England
Dutch expatriate sportspeople in Saudi Arabia
Dutch expatriate sportspeople in the United Arab Emirates
Moroccan expatriate sportspeople in England
Moroccan expatriate sportspeople in the United Arab Emirates
Moroccan expatriate sportspeople in Saudi Arabia